Alfred Collingwood Hughes (1868 – 17 February 1935) was a British sailor who competed in the 1908 Summer Olympics. He was a crew member of the British boat Sorais, which won the bronze medal in the 8 metre class.

References

External links 
 
 
 

1868 births
1935 deaths
British male sailors (sport)
Olympic sailors of Great Britain
Olympic bronze medallists for Great Britain
Olympic medalists in sailing
Sailors at the 1908 Summer Olympics – 8 Metre
Medalists at the 1908 Summer Olympics
20th-century British people